Acanthiza is a genus of passeriform birds, most endemic to Australia, but with two species (A. murina and A. cinerea) restricted to New Guinea. These birds  are commonly known as thornbills.  They are not closely related to species in the hummingbird genera Chalcostigma and Ramphomicron, which are also called thornbills.

They are found primarily in Australia and have a thin long beak. Colloquially the thornbill is sometimes referred to as a “tit” by locals, but in reality the Australian continent lacks any true tits, albeit Acanthiza species do show some similarities with tits in their behavior. They have a similar role as small insect-eating birds with titmice and kinglets. Like tits, Thornbills live in small groups foraging amidst trees and shrubs, and feed in a similar manner. Cooperative breeding is recorded from most species except the brown and Tasmanian thornbills.

The habitat preferences of the group vary from dense forest to open saltbush and bluebush plains.

Acanthiza follow a very characteristic undulating path when flying. Their diet is formed essentially of little insects and plant lice that these birds glean from foliage. They are also exceptional acrobats that are easily able to stay head downward like tits do.

The nest of the Acanthiza is a large dome-shaped construction, completely enclosed except for a side hole, just like that of the long-tailed tit; however Acanthiza adds to it an additional room whose function is unknown. It is somewhat similar to the Aegithalidae in combining long incubation periods with highly synchronous hatching. This combination, normally impossible due to intense competition for food, occurs because parents and (usually) helpers can organise food supply in such a manner that sibling competition for food is virtually absent.

The number of eggs usually ranges from two to four, and the incubation period is around twenty days with laying intervals of two days.

Species
The genus contains 14 species:
 Mountain thornbill, Acanthiza katherina
 Brown thornbill, Acanthiza pusilla
 Inland thornbill, Acanthiza apicalis
 Tasmanian thornbill, Acanthiza ewingii
 New Guinea thornbill, Acanthiza murina
 Chestnut-rumped thornbill, Acanthiza uropygialis
 Buff-rumped thornbill, Acanthiza reguloides
 Western thornbill, Acanthiza inornata
 Slender-billed thornbill, Acanthiza iredalei
 Yellow-rumped thornbill, Acanthiza chrysorrhoa
 Yellow thornbill, Acanthiza nana
 Grey thornbill, Acanthiza cinerea
 Striated thornbill, Acanthiza lineata
 Slaty-backed thornbill, Acanthiza robustirostris

References

 Del Hoyo, J.; Elliot, A. & Christie D. (editors). (2006). Handbook of the Birds of the World. Volume 12: Picathartes to Tits and Chickadees. Lynx Edicions.

External links

Acanthiza fotos & videos on the Internet Bird Collection

 
Bird genera
Taxa named by Nicholas Aylward Vigors
Taxa named by Thomas Horsfield